"Frühlingsfeier" is a song composed by Richard Strauss using the text of a poem with the same name by Heinrich Heine (1797-1856), the fifth in his Opus 56 collection, (TrV 220) which was published in 1906. Originally written for piano and voice, Strauss wrote an orchestral version in 1933.

Composition History

Strauss set three of Heine's poems in his six Opus 56 songs, the poem Frühlingsfeier being from Heine's collection Romanzen (1839–42). Startling and vivid, it depicts one of the wildest and most colorful of Spring rituals, the festival of Adonis...In addition to being the ideal of manly beauty, Adonis was the God of vegetation whose death and return to life represent decay in winter and its revival in Spring. 

Jefferson believes that "This is the most uninhibited of Strauss's lieder so far as the words go, and certainly he matched these words to perfection in his later orchestral setting" The orchestral version was written for Viorica Ursuleac in 1933. With this song "he had reached his ultimate formula in transparent coloring of a big song supported by big orchestral forces" and "..it is a virtuoso song in every respect, and given the right kind of agony in its interpretation, the final six repetitions of "Adonis!" can wring the heart". Del Mar also believes that the song "...remains in its orchestral version one of the most passionately colorful of Strauss's Lieder".

Lyrics

"The poem expresses the ecstacy of the Spring festival of Adonis: its title could be translated as...Rite of Spring, and Heine's poem expresses the cyclic ritual death motif. Frühlingsfeier is a paen of pagan worship from Strauss's beloved Greece". Strauss added four repetitions of the name "Adonis" to the last verse.

Orchestral arrangement

Strauss finished the orchestral arrangement on September 3, 1933 whilst staying at the Hotel Rez in Bad Wiessee (during the same visit he also orchestrated Mein Auge and Befreit). The premier of the orchestral version was given on 12 October 1933 in Berlin with Strauss conducting the Berlin philharmonic, Viorica Ursuleac the soloist.

 Two flutes, Piccolo, two oboes, English horn, two clarinets, Bass clarinet, two bassoons and one Contrabassoon.
 Four french horns, two trumpets, three trombones
 Timpani and Cymbal
 One harp.
 Strings

References
Notes

Sources

Norman Del Mar, Richard Strauss. A Critical Commentary on his Life and Works, Volume 3, London: Faber and Faber (2009)[1968] (second edition), .
Jefferson, Alan. (1971) The Lieder of Richard Strauss, Cassel and Company, London. .
Trenner, Franz (2003) Richard Strauss Chronik, Verlag Dr Richard Strauss Gmbh, Wien, .

Songs by Richard Strauss
1906 songs